Rotraud Hansmann (born  1 March 1940) is an Austrian soprano in opera and concert. She was a singer in the recordings by Nikolaus Harnoncourt which began historically informed performances, such as Monteverdi's operas and works by Johann Sebastian Bach. She was a teacher at the University of Music and Performing Arts, Vienna.

Career 
Born in Graz, Hansmann studied voice at the Graz Conservatory, also the piano, violin and guitar. She studied further in Amsterdam. She made her debut in 1960 at the Graz Opera as a Boy in Mozart's Die Zauberflöte. In 1964 she joined the Deutsche Oper am Rhein.

Hansmann recorded Monteverdi's Vespro della Beata Vergine with the Monteverdi-Chor, conducted by Jürgen Jürgens. She also recorded Bach cantatas, sacred music by Mozart and Mendelssohn's Lobgesang. She appeared as one of the Flower Maidens in Georg Solti's 1972 recording of Parsifal, with René Kollo in the title role.

Hansmann was a singer in recordings by Nikolaus Harnoncourt, pioneering historically informed performances. She appeared in Monteverdi's operas, as La Musica and Euridice in L'Orfeo, alongside Lajos Kozma as Orfeo. A reviewer noted: "Rotraud Hansmann as Euridice sings beautifully with crisp diction and much attention to inflection." In 1968 Hansmann recorded the first soprano part of Bach's Mass in B minor.

References

External links 
 
 Rotraud Hansmann arkivmusic.com
 Geburtstage im im März 2014 / 1.3. Rotraud Handmann wird 75 (in German) Der neue Merker

Austrian operatic sopranos
1940 births
Living people
Musicians from Graz
20th-century Austrian women opera singers
Academic staff of the University of Music and Performing Arts Vienna
University of Music and Performing Arts Graz alumni